Sobolev, Vladimir Stepanovich  (17 May 1908 in Lugansk – 1 September 1982 in Moscow) was a Russian geologist, working in mineralogy, petrology and theory of metamorphism. He was born in Lugansk, and died in Moscow. Sobolev predicted deposits of diamonds in Eastern Siberia.

References

Russian mineralogists
1908 births
1982 deaths
Saint Petersburg Mining University alumni
Presidents of the International Mineralogical Association